Aaron John Brumbaugh (February 14, 1890 – February 25, 1983) was a higher education administrator and professor of education, and the sixth president of Shimer College.

Brumbaugh was born in Hartville, Ohio in early 1893.  He subsequently became a teacher and superintendent in local schools, before traveling to Mount Morris College in Mount Morris, Illinois, where he received his BA in 1914.  He served as the superintendent of the Mount Morris schools from 1914 to 1915, and as professor of English at Mount Morris College from 1915 to 1918.  In 1918 he received his MA from the University of Chicago, and was named Dean at Mount Morris College.  In 1921 he became president of Mount Morris College, a position which he held until resigning in 1925.

Brumbaugh taught at the University of Chicago beginning in 1926, and completed his Ph.D. there in 1929 with a dissertation on the authority of school boards as defined by the courts.  He became an Associate Professor in 1935 and rose to full Professor the following year, holding that rank until his retirement in 1944.  In 1937, he became president of the American College Personnel Association.

In 1941, Robert Maynard Hutchins appointed Brumbaugh Dean of Students at the College of the University of Chicago.  He had previously held the position of Acting Dean.  Brumbaugh retired from the university in 1944 but remained active in professional associations.

As president of Shimer College in Mount Carroll, Illinois from 1950 to 1954, Brumbaugh presided over the transition of the Shimer curriculum from a women's junior college to a four-year coeducational Great Books college.  He was the first president to preside over the school under its current name, as the name was changed from "Frances Shimer College" to "Shimer College" at the time that the school became coeducational.

In 1955, Brumbaugh left Shimer to take a staff position with the Southern Regional Education Board in Atlanta, Georgia.  He held this position until retiring for the second time in 1970.  He and his wife then moved to Florida.

See also
History of Shimer College

Notes

External links
 

1890 births
1983 deaths
Presidents of Shimer College
People from Hartville, Ohio
Mount Morris College alumni
University of Chicago alumni
20th-century American academics